Flight 602 is the third album released by Aim, and the first released on his own ATIC Records independent record label. It is Aim's third album of studio material, the other two being DJ mix albums. It was released on 25 September 2006. Several tracks were co-written by, and feature vocals from, ATIC label-mate Niko.

The album's title is named after the flight that Charles Bukowski took to his first poetry reading in Germany.

Track listing
 "Intro No. 3"
 "Walking Home Through the Park"
 "Northwest"
 "Puget Sound"
 "Pier 57"
 "Smile"
 "Landlord"
 "Aberdeen"
 "Birchwood"
 "Flight 602"
 "Interview"
 "It's Later Than You Think"

The track "Pier 57" was named after a holding area for peace protesters during the 2004 Republican conference in New York.
Turner said of the event: 

The closing track, "It's Later Than You Think", was originally a song by Turner's band project, Paperboy.

References

External links
 Flight 602 official site
 Aim's Flight 602 MySpace page
 ATIC Records official site

2006 albums
Aim (musician) albums